Age of Empires IV is a real-time strategy video game developed by Relic Entertainment in partnership with World's Edge and published by Xbox Game Studios. It is the fourth installment of the Age of Empires series. The game was released October 28, 2021 for Windows. It is also scheduled to release for Xbox One and Xbox Series X/S in 2023.

Gameplay

The game is set during the Early Middle Ages to the early Renaissance.

There are 8 civilizations available at the release date; the English, the Chinese, the Mongols, the Delhi Sultanate, the French, the Abbasid Dynasty, the Holy Roman Empire, and the Rus. In August 2022, it was announced that two civilizations, the Ottomans and Malians, would be added on 25 October later that year.

The game had 4 single-player campaigns at launch:
 The Normans: about Norman conquest of England and conflicts of subsequent English kings (1066–1217)
 The Hundred Years War: a conflict between England and France
 The Mongol Empire: expansion of one of the largest empires of all time
 The Rise of Moscow: about the rise of Grand Duchy of Moscow amongst other Rus' principalities

Development
On August 21, 2017, Microsoft announced Age of Empires IV, developed by Relic Entertainment. Microsoft's Executive Vice-President of Gaming, Phil Spencer, confirmed on June 11, 2019, that Age of Empires IV was still in development, with more information coming later in 2019. On November 14, 2019, gameplay footage of Age of Empires IV was shown at the X019 event. It showed medieval warfare between English and Mongol forces. On March 16, 2021, the fan preview was released, showing more detailed gameplay and also including the two other known civilizations, the Chinese and the Delhi Sultanate. Microsoft announced at E3 2021 that the game will be released on Game Pass for PC on October 28, 2021. The game released on October 28, 2021 having been developed using the Essence Engine.

Soundtrack 
The game's voiceovers were recorded using historical pronunciation of each language.
In-game music was written by Dynamedion composers Tilman Sillescu (main theme, menu music, trailers, Mongols, Holy Roman Empire), Alexander Röder (Chinese, English), Henning Nugel (Rus', Abbasid), Armin Haas (Delhi Sultanate), and also Mikolai Stroinski (French). The soundtrack is also available as part of the additional content of the Digital Deluxe Edition on Steam.

Reception

The game received "generally favorable reviews" according to review aggregator Metacritic.

IGN summed up their review by saying "Age of Empires 4 is an enjoyable RTS throwback that often plays it too safe, but excels when it doesn't." Rachel Weber of GamesRadar+ praised the variety of the civilizations, writing, "each has been meticulously designed to offer different gameplay experiences". Game Informer liked the history videos between missions, but criticized how the game didn't seem to innovate on the formula of its predecessor, feeling that Age of Empires IV "lacks any ambition to even gently jostle the standards set by Age of Empires II decades earlier". Hayes Madsen of CGMagazine summed up his 10/10 review by saying "Age of Empires IV is a bold and ambitious evolution of the series, and quite likely one of the best RTS games ever made."

The Washington Post enjoyed the campaign balancing describing it as how "Every battle feels like it could tip any way at any moment" and that there was a "magic to this design". VG247 felt that the game's commitment to historical accuracy set it apart from its strategy game peers "making Age of Empires 4 more than just another medieval combat simulator". PCGamesNs Ian Boudreau praised the Art of War tutorials, saying they were "hugely helpful for new players who want to understand the nuts and bolts of successful economy management".

Robert Zak of PC Gamer felt the distinct civilizations were the fourth entry's greatest triumph, calling "the visual and strategic" variety "one of the most significant evolutions in the series". He criticized how he felt the game whitewashed history, saying its "squeaky-clean presentation skirts around the ickier parts of history". Polygon felt the simplifications from Age of Empire 2s mechanics benefited the game, saying that the changes led "its complications [to] come more from decision-making and strategy than from the minute details of mechanical plays". Darryn Bonthuys of GameSpot called the game "satisfying", praising the historically educational campaign as well as the uniqueness of the factions. He criticized the dated visuals and the lack of innovativeness regarding the standard Age of Empires formula, saying that the game "rarely ventures out of its comfort zone".

Awards and accolades
Age of Empires IV won the award for "Best Sim/Strategy Game" at The Game Awards 2021. It also won the award for "Strategy/Simulation Game of the Year" at the 25th Annual D.I.C.E. Awards.

References

External links
 
 

2021 video games
4
D.I.C.E. Award for Strategy/Simulation Game of the Year winners
Interactive Achievement Award winners
Microsoft games
Multiplayer and single-player video games
Real-time strategy video games
Relic Entertainment games
The Game Awards winners
Video game sequels
Video games developed in Canada
Video games developed in the United States
Video games set in the Middle Ages
Windows games
Xbox Cloud Gaming games
Xbox One games
Xbox Series X and Series S games